Ludo is a strategy board game for two to four players, in which the players race their four  from start to finish according to the rolls of a single die. Like other cross and circle games, Ludo is derived from the Indian game Pachisi. The game and its variations are popular in many countries and under various names.

History

The Mahabharata 
Pachisi was created in India in the sixth century CE. The earliest evidence of this game's evolution in India is the depiction of boards on the caves of Ellora. The original version is also described in the Indian epic Mahabharata in which Shakuni uses cursed dice to beat the Pandavas, and at last after losing everything, Yudhisthira puts his wife Draupadi on stake and loses her, too.  The Pandavas get all their belongings back, though, after Draupadi vows to curse the whole Kuru lineage, but stops at the intervention of Gandhari, and seeing an opportunity to still Draupadi's anger, Kuru king Dhritarashtra promises to give back to the Pandavas all that they had lost in the game.

It was also known as Chaupar in ancient times. The contemporary version was played by the Mughal emperors of India; a notable example is Akbar.

Pachisi was modified to use a cubic die with a die cup and patented as "Ludo" in England in 1896.  The Royal Navy took Ludo and converted it into the board game Uckers.

Ludo board 

Special areas of the Ludo board are typically coloured bright yellow, green, red, and blue. Each player is assigned a colour and has four tokens in their colour. The board is normally square with a cross-shaped , with each arm of the cross having three columns of squares, usually six per column. The middle columns usually have five squares coloured; these represent a player's home column. A sixth coloured square not on the home column is a player's starting square. At the centre of the board is a large finishing square, often composed of coloured triangles atop the players' home columns (thus depicting "arrows" pointing to the finish).

Rules

Overview 

Two, three, or four can play, without partnerships. When able to, the players enter their tokens one per turn on their respective starting squares and proceed to race them clockwise around the board along the game track (the path of squares not part of any player's home column). When reaching the square below their home column, a player continues by moving tokens up the column to the finishing square. The rolls of a single die control the swiftness of the tokens, and entry to the finishing square requires a precise roll from the player. The first to bring all their tokens to the finish wins the game. The others often continue to play to determine second-, third-, and fourth-place finishers.

Gameplay
Each player rolls a die; the highest roller begins the game. Players alternate turns in a clockwise direction. To enter a token into play from its yard to its starting square, a player must roll a six. Players can draw a token from home every time they get a six unless home is empty or move a piece six times. The start box has two own tokens (is doubled). If the player has no tokens yet in play and rolls other than a six, the turn passes to the next player.

Players must always move a token according to the die value rolled. Once players have one or more tokens in play, they select a token and move it forwards along the track the number of squares indicated by the die. If you roll a certain number and that forces your token to land on a spot occupied by another person's token then you capture that token and force the person to return that token back to their home point. This forces them to roll another 6 to take it out of their home and move it again. While doing your turn, if 2 of your tokens land on the same spot then they create something that is called a block. A block means that if an opposing token lands on the same spot as the block, the player is forced to return the token back to their home base. 

If the player cannot draw a token from home, rolling a six earns the player an additional or "bonus" roll in that turn. If the bonus roll results in a six again, the player earns again an additional bonus roll. If the third roll is also a six, the player may not move and the turn immediately passes to the next player.

If the advance of a token ends on a square occupied by an opponent's token, the opponent token is returned to its owner's yard. The returned token can be re-entered into play only when the owner rolls a six. If a piece lands on the same space as another piece of the same colour, the pieces are doubled and form a "block". If the advance of a block ends on an opponent’s block, the latter is captured and returned to its owner’s yard, collectively.

A player's home column squares are always safe, since no opponent may enter them. In the home column, a player cannot jump over; after one rotation is completed, the player must enter the home and roll the exact number needed to get each token onto the home triangle.

Once you have gotten all your tokens into the home triangle, if you are the first person to do so, you have won the game and in house rules you can wait for the others to finish and get 2nd, 3rd or 4th.

Variants

List of international variants

Ludo exists under different names and brands, and in various game derivations:
 Uckers, British
 Pachisi, Indian
 Fia, Swedish
 Eile mit Weile (Haste makes Pace), Swiss
 Cờ cá ngựa, Vietnamese
 Parchís, Spanish
 Parqués, Colombian
Vuelta obligada (mandatory restart)
Cielo robado (stolen heaven)
De piedra en piedra (from stone to stone)
Con Policía (With Policeman)

Mensch ärgere dich nicht
Mensch ärgere dich nicht (Man, Don't Get Angry), is a German game from 1914 and has equivalent names in Albanian, Bulgarian, Croatian, Czech, Greek, Italian, Macedonian, Polish, Romanian, Serbian, Slovak, Slovenian, and Turkish.
 Mens Erger Je Niet (Dutch)
 Non t'arrabbiare (Italian)
 Človek, ne jezi se (Slovenian)
 Člověče, nezlob se (Czech)
 Čovječe, ne ljuti se (Croatian)
 Човече не љути се (Serbian)
 Kızma Birader (Turkish)
 Człowieku, nie irytuj się (Polish)

German specific
 Verliere nicht den Kopf (Do not lose your head)
 Coppit
 Brändi Dog

French
 Jeu des petits chevaux

Hasbro

Hasbro has multiple brand names for ludo-like games from its acquisitions including:
 Aggravation
 Headache
 Game of Headache, British
 Based on Pachisi
 Parcheesi, North American
 Sorry!; North American and British
 Trouble, North American
 Kimble, Finnish version of Trouble
 Frustration, British and Irish version of Trouble

Chinese
 Aeroplane chess: A Chinese cross-and-circle board game derived from Ludo, it uses aeroplanes as tokens, with additional features such as coloured cells, jumps, and shortcuts.

Canadian
 Tock: Players race their four tokens (or marbles) around the game board from start to finish, with the objective being to be the first to take all of one's tokens "home". Like Sorry!, it is played with playing cards rather than dice.

Latvian
The Latvian version of the game is called "Riču-Raču". The board is larger than the original board with seven home spaces instead of four (but the player must always reach the four furthest home spaces anyway, if the player overrolls, then they must move the extra spaces back and wait for their next turn). Captures are allowed and two tokens cannot occupy the same space. If a player rolls a one or a six, they can either get a second roll or move a token to the starting position.

Differences

 Ludo played in the Indian subcontinent features a safe square in each quadrant, normally the fourth square from the top in the rightmost column. These squares are usually marked with a star. In India Ludo is often played with two dice, and rolling 1 on a die also allows a token to enter active play. Thus if a player rolls a 1 and a 6, they may get a token out and move it six steps.
In Pakistan, a variation that uses two dice allows backwards movement. The dice are rolled and the die values can be used independently or in combination to move two pieces or a single piece forwards or backwards or both. (E.g., if the roll gives 1 and 4, the player can move a single piece 4 steps forwards and then 1 step backwards, or 1 step forwards and 4 steps backwards, or 1 then 4 steps forwards or backwards. Or the player can move a piece 1 step forwards or backwards, and another piece 4 steps forwards or backwards.)
 To get a game started faster, some house rules allow a player with no pieces on the board to bring their first piece into play on any roll, on a 1 or a 6, or allow multiple tries to roll a 6 (with three rolls being the most popular).
 If a piece lands on the same space as another piece of the same colour, the moved piece must take the preceding space.
 Some variations permit doubled blocks to be passed by rolling a 6 or 1.
 A block of two or more pieces can be taken by an opponent's single piece.
 Doubled pieces may move half the number if an even number is thrown (e.g. move two spaces if a 4 is thrown).
 A doubled piece may capture another doubled piece (like in Coppit). Three pieces together are weak and can be cut by a single piece.
 A board may have only four spaces in each home column. All four of a player's pieces must finish in these spaces for the player to have finished the game. (See .)
 A player must move all the numbers rolled (e.g. if a player rolls multiple 6s, they have to use all the numbers to move).
 A player cannot capture or enter finish if they have numbers remaining. (E.g., if a player rolls a 6 and a 2 and they have the option to capture or enter finish with one of their pieces using the 2, they can only do so if they have another piece that can use the 6.)
 To speed the game up, extra turns or bonus moves can be awarded for capturing a piece or getting a piece home; these may grant passage past a block.
 In Denmark and some other countries the board has eight spaces marked with a globe and eight with a star. The globes are safe spaces where a piece cannot be captured. The exception is that a player who has not yet entered all pieces, can always enter a piece on a roll of 6. If the entry space is occupied by another player's piece, that piece is captured. Otherwise the entry spaces work like the other globe spaces. A piece which would have landed on a star instead moves to the next star.
 In Vietnam, it is called "Cờ cá ngựa", where the game is modeled after a horse race with the tokens modeled as horse heads. In this variation, a 1 is given equal status to a 6 (meaning that the player can enter a token into play and can roll again). Furthermore, once a player's token reaches their home column, it can only go up each square with an exact roll. This means that a person outside the column must roll a 1 to enter the first square, a 2 afterwards to enter the second, and so forth.

African
In some parts of Africa including Nigeria, Botswana, Lesotho and South Africa, the following rules are reportedly played:
 A doubled block also blocks trailing pieces of the player who created the block, or blocks them unless they roll the exact number to land on the block; additionally, the doubled block cannot move forwards until the block that landed upon it moves off again. This reduces the tactical advantage of a block and makes the game more interesting.
 If the two players sitting opposite are partners, the players can exchange numbers.
 There are four safety squares on the board, like castle squares in Pachisi, as well as the safe home squares, where a piece may able to move forwards or backwards and start their turn before previous player finishes.
 A piece landing on a square with an opponent's piece not only sends the opponent piece back to the starting area but also sends the landing piece to its home square.
 A player cannot move their first piece into the home column unless they have captured at least one piece of any of the opponents.
 If a player captures the piece of another player, they are awarded a bonus roll. If in the bonus roll, another player's piece is captured, another bonus roll is awarded and so on.

Explanatory notes

References

Citations

General bibliography 
 
  
 
 
 

 Attribution

External links 

Board games introduced in the 1890s
Children's board games
Cross and circle games
Games and sports introduced in 1896
Indian inventions
Pakistani games